Dimitrios Terezopoulos (born 28 May 1966) is a Greek professional football manager.

References

1966 births
Living people
Greek football managers
Panionios F.C. managers
Asteras Tripolis F.C. managers
Ethnikos Piraeus F.C. managers
Sportspeople from Athens